Selo sanatoriya imeni Chekhova (Çexov A.P. isemedäge şifaxana awılı) is a rural locality (a selo) in Vozdvizhensky Selsoviet, Alsheyevsky District, Bashkortostan, Russia. The population was 168 as of 2010. There are 5 streets.

Geography 
It is located 44 km southwest of Rayevsky (the district's administrative centre) by road. Bugulminka is the nearest rural locality.

References 

Rural localities in Alsheyevsky District